El Father Plays Himself is a 2020 internationally co-produced documentary film directed by Mo Scarpelli, an Italian-American filmmaker. It premiered at the 51º Visions du Réel and it’s a co-production between Venezuela, United Kingdom, Italy and the United States. The movie follows the filming of La Fortaleza, a movie about a son who goes back to his native country to tell the story of his father, who at the same time plays the main character in the film.

Plot 
Jorge Thielen Armand is a young filmmaker who left Venezuela, his home country, when he was 15 years old. Years later, as an adult in 2019, he decided to go back, specifically to the Amazon jungle, with the only goal of telling the story of his father in a deeply personal film. Jorge Roque Thielen, the director's father, plays himself in the feature.

In the movie it is easily perceived that fiction and reality intertwine. The theme of El Father Plays Himself shows an act of love and ambition that transforms into a difficult process during the filming, which forces both father and son to face their past and make peace with it. In the words of the director, “it is the clash of fear and love”.

Cast 

 Jorge Roque Thielen H.
 Jorge Thielen Armand

Reception 
Sheri Linden of The Hollywood Reporter wrote that El Father Plays Himself was "a tantalizing house of mirrors" and Emiliano Granada of Variety expressed that he found it "a deeply human portrayal". Joshua Brunsting of Criterion Cast said: "there’s a lyricism and poetry to the filmmaking, allowing for viewers to become completely immersed into Scarpelli’s rumination on filmmaking, family and loss... Sincerely one of the best films of 2020".

Additionally, it received the Special Mention at the 51st edition of Visions du Réel, at the Perso Film Festival, and at the 22nd edition of the Lucania Film Festival. It was in the IDFA Best of Festivals Selection and was the Opening Night Film at the Cucalorus Film Festival. It was also the 2020 Torino Film Lab Audience Design Fund winner.

Awards and nominations

References

External links 

 
 El Father Plays Himself at FilmAffinity.
 El Father Plays Himself at Vimeo on Demand.

2020 documentary films
2020 films
Venezuelan documentary films
British documentary films
Italian documentary films
American documentary films
2020s American films
2020s British films